Susan Charlotte (born July 21, 1954) is an American playwright, screenwriter and author.

Best known as a playwright, Charlotte was the inaugural recipient of the Joseph Kesselring Prize. She is the author of such plays as The Shoemaker, Love Divided By/Times Three and Did You Know My Husband? She is also a screenwriter whose films include: A Broken Sole and Come On. Charlotte has written for CBS, PBS and Lifetime TV. She is the author of two critically acclaimed books. She is the founding artistic director of the award-winning theatre company Food For Thought Productions and the non-profit theatre company Cause Celebre Productions. She has also been a Film and Theatre professor at Columbia University, CUNY, and NYU.

Career

Theatre
She has written fifteen full-length plays and fifty one-acts.  Her plays, which have been produced for over thirty years, include: the 2011 Off-Broadway premiere of The Shoemaker starring Danny Aiello and directed by Antony Marsellis, who also directed the film version entitled Something Like That with Danny Aiello. Her play The Hairdresser, which has enjoyed multiple productions, starred Kathleen Chalfant, Maria Tucci, Louise Lasser and Steven Schetzner.

She also founded a school for writers, Prism Playhouse Inc. and two theatre companies—Food For Thought Productions (winner of the National Arts Club Gold Medal in drama) where she premiered plays by Tennessee Williams, Tony Kushner and Lynn Redgrave and the not-for-profit theatre, Cause Celebre Productions.

Film
Her film credits include: A Broken Sole, which was theatrically released in 2007 and directed by Antony Marsellis, starred Danny Aiello, Margaret Colin, Bob Dishy, Judith Light, Laila Robins, and John Shea. Come On, premiered at the Hamptons International Film Festival in 2000. Love Divided By (based on her play) with original music by Philip Glass, was chosen to open MoMA's Titus II theatre.

Television
Her TV credits include: CBS' "Comedy Zone" (1984), which starred Patty Duke and Paul Reiser, the daytime series "Loving" (1983), "Guiding Light", and PBS' "Did You Know My Husband?" (2018) with Carole Shelley and Louise Lasser.
In addition, She has written for Lifetime TV.

Books
She has written two critically acclaimed books, "Creativity: Conversations with 28 Who Excel" and "Creativity in Film: Conversations with 14 Who Excel".

Awards
She is the recipient of the inaugural Joseph Kesselring Prize. Her theatre company Food For Thought Productions was the recipient of the National Arts Club Gold Medal of Honor for Achievement in the Dramatic Arts.

List of works

Full-Length Plays Include
 The Shoemaker
 Prism Blues
 Delicate Choices
 It Takes One Litre of Petrol and Twenty Minutes
 Before It Happened
 Love Divided By/Times Three
 Sublet
 The Round Table (Collaboration with Peter Stone)

One-Act Plays Include
Love Divided By
 Folded Hands
 Tango Finish
 The Shoemaker
 The Cabbie
 The Dyslexic Lover
 The Hairdresser
 Come On
 The Typist
 The Neon Sign Man
 I Can Imagine/I Can't Imagine
 The Squeegee Man
 Life in a Paper Bag
 The Pirates (Co-Written by Pascal Aubier)
 Between a Local and an Express
 What She Didn't Say
 The Cleaning Girl

Theatrical Adaptations Include
 When The Women Come Out To Dance by Elmore Leonard
 Sparks by Elmore Leonard
 The Rocking Horse Winner by D.H. Lawrence
 Youth by Joseph Conrad
 The Wall by Jean-Paul Sartre
 The Yellow Wallpaper by Charlotte Perkins
 The Lottery by Shirley Jackson

Films Include
 A Broken Sole
 Something Like That
 Come On
 Out of Your Hands

Television Include
 "The Comedy Zone"
 "Loving"
 "Guiding Light"
 "Dr. Ruth"
 "Did You Know My Husband?"

References

External links
 
 

1954 births
20th-century American dramatists and playwrights
Screenwriters from New York (state)
American women dramatists and playwrights
Living people
Writers from New York City
American women television writers
Jewish American dramatists and playwrights
20th-century American women writers
American television writers
21st-century American Jews
21st-century American women